The Parco degli Acquedotti is a public park to the southeast of Rome, Italy. It is part of the Appian Way Regional Park and is of approximately 240 ha.

Description 
The park is named after the aqueducts that run through it. It is crossed on one side by the Aqua Felix  and also contains part of the Aqua Claudia and the remains of Villa delle Vignacce to the North West. A short stretch of the original Roman Via Latina can also be seen.

The park is near the Cinecittà film studios and is often used as a film location. In the opening shot of La Dolce Vita, a statue of Christ is suspended from a helicopter that flies along the route of the Aqua Claudia.

Notable events 

On 7 August 2019 the park witnessed the murder of Fabrizio Piscitelli, who was killed by a jogger armed with a pistol as he sat on one of the park's benches. Known as Diabolik, Piscitelli had been the leader of the Irriducibili, the gang of Ultras who supported the Lazio Football Club in Rome.

See also 
 Aqueduct
 Roman aqueduct
 List of aqueducts in the city of Rome
 List of parks and gardens in Rome

References

External links
  Romacivica
 Photographs 
 and more Photographs on Flickr
 
 

Acquedotti, Parco degli